The Territorial Prelature of Corocoro  is a territorial prelature located in the city of Coro Coro in the Ecclesiastical province of La Paz in Bolivia.

History
 December 25, 1949: Established as Territorial Prelature of Corocoro from the Metropolitan Archdiocese of La Paz

Prelates of Corocoro
 Ubaldo Evaristo Cibrián Fernández, C.P. (1953–1965)
 Jesús Agustín López de Lama, C.P. (1966–1991)
 Toribio Ticona Porco (1992–2012), elevated to Cardinal in 2018
 Percy Lorenzo Galvan Flores (2013–2020), appointed as Archbishop of La Paz in May 2020
 Pascual Limachi Ortiz (2021–present)

See also
Roman Catholicism in Bolivia

References

External links
 GCatholic.org

Roman Catholic dioceses in Bolivia
Christian organizations established in 1949
Roman Catholic dioceses and prelatures established in the 20th century
Corocoro, Territorial Prelature of
Territorial prelatures
1949 establishments in Bolivia